Watch Me When I Kill (/ The Cat with the Jade Eyes), also known as The Cat's Victims in the UK, is a 1977 Italian giallo film co-written and directed by Antonio Bido. The American prints have an additional short credit sequence that was filmed in the USA, slightly different from the other versions. It has also been released as Terror in the Lagoon (France) and The Vote of Death (Germany). Herman Cohen (of Konga fame) co-produced the film.

Plot  
A young dancer named Mara calls at a pharmacy moments after the murder of the pharmacist inside, but the killer prevents her access by holding the door shut. Fearing she knows too much, the perpetrator soon makes an attempt on her life, causing her to move in with her boyfriend, Lukas, for protection. Several other people begin turning up murdered, one having her head forced into an oven and another strangled in a bathtub. An escaped murderer named Pasquale Ferrante seems the most likely suspect to Lukas, since most of the victims were jurors at Ferrante's murder trial. Lukas later learns the trail of clues leads back to World War II and events involving a group of Nazi collaborators.

Cast 
Corrado Pani as Lukas
Paola Tedesco as Mara
Franco Citti as Pasquale Ferrante
Fernando Cerulli as Giovanni Bozzi
Giuseppe Addobbati as The judge
Paolo Malco as Carlo
 Gianfranco Bullo
 Yill Pratt
 Bianca Toccafondi
 Giovanni Vanini

Release 
The Film was released in Italy in the summer on 
6 August 1977. The film wouldn’t receive a theatrical release 
in the United States until 3 September 1982 by short-lived 
American independent film distributor Cobra Media.

See also     
 List of Italian films of 1977

References

External links

1977 films
1970s crime thriller films
Giallo films
Films directed by Antonio Bido
1970s Italian films